Johnnie Johnson (born October 8, 1956) is a former American college and professional football player who was a cornerback and safety in the National Football League (NFL) for ten seasons during the 1980s.  Johnson played college football for the University of Texas, and was a two-time unanimous All-America.  A first-round choice in the 1980 NFL Draft, he played professionally for the Los Angeles Rams and Seattle Seahawks. Johnson was elected to the College Football Hall of Fame in May 2007. Johnson's son, Collin Johnson, plays for the New York Giants as a wide receiver.

College career
In his final three seasons he was a member of a team that placed among the nation's top-ten in total defense. Johnson also excelled on special teams as a punt return specialist. Many of his punt return marks still stand in the UT record books. In his freshman year, Johnson got off to a great start being named a starter in his first game, but a leg injury kept him on the sidelines for much of the year. The next year, he regained his starting status on a team that went through the regular season undefeated. That year his fourth-down tackle inside the Texas five-yard line preserved a win over Oklahoma. He won the first of three All-Southwest Conference honors that year. In an era before the advent of the Thorpe Award, Johnson was named the nation's top defensive back of 1978 by the New York Downtown Athletic Club.

Professional career
Johnson was drafted by the Rams in the first round of the 1980 NFL Draft with the 17th pick.  The Rams signed him to a six-year, $1 million contract., which caused veteran free-agent Rams Jack Youngblood, Jim Youngblood, Dennis Harrah, and Larry Brooks to hold out during the 1980 pre-season.

Off the field, he appeared in the 1986 Rams promotional video, Let's Ram It.

See also
List of Texas Longhorns football All-Americans
List of Los Angeles Rams first-round draft picks

References

1956 births
Living people
African-American players of American football
All-American college football players
American football cornerbacks
American football safeties
College Football Hall of Fame inductees
Los Angeles Rams players
People from La Grange, Texas
Seattle Seahawks players
Texas Longhorns football players
21st-century African-American people
20th-century African-American sportspeople